Nguyễn Văn Toản (born 26 November 1999) is a Vietnamese professional footballer who plays as a goalkeeper for V.League 1 side Hải Phòng and the Vietnam national team.

Career statistics

Club

Notes

International

Honours
Vietnam U23/Olympic
Southeast Asian Games: 2019, 2021
Vietnam
AFF Championship runners-up: 2022
VFF Cup: 2022

References

1999 births
Living people
Vietnamese footballers
Vietnam youth international footballers
Association football goalkeepers
V.League 1 players
Haiphong FC players
People from Haiphong
Competitors at the 2021 Southeast Asian Games
Southeast Asian Games competitors for Vietnam